William O'Shannessy (born 28 August 1999) is an Australian representative rower. He has represented at underage and senior World Championships and won a bronze medal at the 2022 World Championships.

Club and state rowing
O'Shannessy was educated and took up rowing at St Joseph's College, Hunters Hill in Sydney. His senior club rowing has been from the Sydney University Boat Club. He first made state selection for New South Wales in the 2018 men's youth eight which contested and won the Noel F Wilkinson Trophy at the Interstate Regatta within the Australian Rowing Championships.  He made a second New South Wales youth eight appearance in 2019.

In 2021 O'Shannessy moved into the New South Wales senior eight to contest the King's Cup at the Interstate Regatta within the Australian Rowing Championships In 2022 O'Shannessy was in the New South Wales eight which won the King's Cup.

International representative rowing
O'Shannessy made his Australian representative debut in a coxless four at the  2019 U23 World Rowing Championships in Sarasota Florida. They finished ninth overall.

In March 2022 Kench was selected in the Australian senior training team to prepare for the 2022 international season and the 2022 World Rowing Championships. He rowed in the six seat the Australian men's eight to a silver medal placings at the World Rowing Cups III in July 2022. At the 2022 World Rowing Championships at Racize, O'Shannessy took to the seven seat. The eight won through their repechage to make the A final where they raced to a third place and a World Championship bronze medal.

References

External links

1999 births
Living people
Australian male rowers
World Rowing Championships medalists for Australia
21st-century Australian people
People educated at St Joseph's College, Hunters Hill